Penthea pardalis is a species of beetle in the family Cerambycidae. It was described by Newman in 1842. It is known from Australia. It contains the varietas Penthea pardalis var. occidentalis.

References

Pteropliini
Beetles described in 1842